Cassia falcata  may refer to:
 Senna corymbosa, an ornamental plant in the genus Senna
 Senna occidentalis, the coffee senna, a pantropical plant species